Spencer R. Igo (born March 26, 1996) is an American politician serving in the Minnesota House of Representatives since 2021. A member of the Republican Party of Minnesota, Igo represents District 7A in northern Minnesota, including the city of Hibbing and parts of Aitkin, Itasca and St. Louis Counties.

Early life, education and career 
Igo grew up Grand Rapids, Minnesota and graduated from Grand Rapids High School. He earned a Bachelor of Science degree in public administration from the University of North Dakota.

Igo worked as a field director for Jason Lewis's 2018 campaign for the United States House of Representatives. He then worked as Congressman Pete Stauber's northern field representative in Minnesota's 8th congressional district from 2019 to 2021.

Minnesota House of Representatives 
Igo was elected to the Minnesota House of Representatives in 2020 and was reelected in 2022. He first ran after two-term Republican incumbent Sandy Layman announced that she would not seek reelection. Following 2022 legislative redistricting, he was drawn into the same area as DFL Representative Julie Sandstede, whom he defeated in the general election.

Igo serves as an assistant minority leader for the House Republican caucus and sits on the Climate and Energy, Economic Development, and Sustainable Infrastructure Committees.

Igo has been outspoken in his support of the mining and timber industries in northern Minnesota, and critical of the state environmental review process. He has argued that bans on mining will send mining jobs overseas where environmental and labor standards are lower and described himself as "pro-labor, against right-to-work." After Russia's invasion of Ukraine, Igo wrote a letter calling on President Joe Biden to increase oil production and mining to decrease reliance on foreign imports.

In 2021, Igo proposed legislation to hold a wolf hunting season. Igo opposed efforts to ban lead fishing tackles due to concerns with implementation and the high cost of alternatives.

Electoral History

Personal life 
Igo lives in Wabana Township, Minnesota. He is a member of St. Joseph's Catholic Church in Grand Rapids, Minnesota.

References

External links 

 Official House of Representatives website
 Official campaign website

Living people
1996 births
Republican Party members of the Minnesota House of Representatives
University of North Dakota alumni
People from Grand Rapids, Minnesota